Pagan Publishing is a role-playing game publishing company founded by John Scott Tynes in 1990. It began by publishing a Call of Cthulhu role-playing game fanzine, The Unspeakable Oath. In 1994, the company moved from Columbia, Missouri to Seattle, Washington where it incorporated. The staff at this time included John Tynes as editor-in-chief, John H. Crowe III as business manager, Dennis Detwiller as art director, and Brian Appleton and Chris Klepac as editors. Tynes, Detwiller, and Adam Scott Glancy released the Delta Green modern Call of Cthulhu campaign setting in 1996. Pagan has released multiple other Call of Cthulhu products, including a foray into card games with Creatures & Cultists and miniature games with The Hills Rise Wild!.

Pagan is based in Seattle, Washington and comprises Adam Scott Glancy as business manager and John H. Crowe III and Brian Appleton as editors. It continues to occasionally produce Call of Cthulhu books as well as non-gaming fiction and non-fiction under the Armitage House imprint.

History
Pagan Publishing was founded in 1990 in Columbia, Missouri by the 19-year-old John Tynes, who had a love for the work of  H.P. Lovecraft and Robert Chambers. The company started with the magazine The Unspeakable Oath, with issue #1 (December 1990) as a digest-sized quarterly full of Call of Cthulhu material. Dennis Detwiller joined the company because of the magazine, after he saw The Unspeakable Oath #3 (Summer 1991), got into touch with Tynes and thereafter started volunteering at the company. Pagan Publishing published compilations of material from their magazine, including: Courting Madness (1992), an anthology of The Unspeakable Oath material; Creatures & Cultists (1992), a reprint of a card game that appeared in The Unspeakable Oath #4 (Fall 1991); and The Weapons Compendium (1993), which contained weapon stats from The Unspeakable Oath and new ones as well.

Products

Call of Cthulhu Supplements
 Alone on Halloween by Scott David Aniolowski and John Tynes
 Devil's Children by David Conyers, David Godley and David Witteveen
 Mortal Coils
 Walker In The Wastes by John H. Crowe III
 Coming Full Circle by John H. Crowe III
 The Realm of Shadows by John H. Crowe III
 The Golden Dawn
 The Resurrected 1: Grace Under Pressure
 The Resurrected 2: Of Keys & Gates
 The Resurrected 3: Out of the Vault
 Final Flight by John H. Crowe III
 The Mysteries of Mesoamerica by Brian Appleton, John H. Crowe III, and Clint Staples
 Bumps in the Night by John H. Crowe III

Delta Green
 Delta Green (February 1, 1997), the basic sourcebook; . 
 Delta Green: Countdown (1999), the 2000s sourcebook, by John Tynes, Dennis Detwiller and Adam Scott Glancy, . 
 Delta Green Eyes Only Volume 1: Machinations of the Mi-go . 
 Delta Green Eyes Only Volume 2: The Fate. 
 Delta Green Eyes Only Volume 3: Project Rainbow . 
 See No Evil (Unspeakable Oath 16/17)
 Delta Green (May 2007), the basic sourcebook with dual BRP/D20 stats; .
 Delta Green: Eyes Only (November 2007), a compilation of the Eyes Only chapbooks with additional material; .

Fiction
 Delta Green: Alien Intelligence (Tynes Cowan Corp, March 1998), short stories collection, .
 Delta Green: Dark Theatres (Armitage House, 1999), short stories collection, .
 Delta Green: The Rules of Engagement (Tynes Cowan Corp, 2000), novel by John Tynes, .
 Delta Green: Denied to the Enemy (Impressions, 2003), novel by Dennis Detwiller, .
 The King in Yellow (Armitage House, 2006), play by Thom Ryng, .

Other Games
 The Hills Rise Wild miniature game
 Creatures & Cultists card game

Non-Fiction
 A Cthulhu Mythos Bibliography & Concordance
 The Lurker in the Lobby

References

External links
Pagan Publishing - official site. Checked March 3rd 2023, no longer available.
Armitage House - official site.

Role-playing game publishing companies
Book publishing companies based in Seattle
Publishing companies established in 1990
Publishing companies based in Columbia, Missouri